Shri Binzani City College, established in 1930, is one of the oldest general degree college in Nagpur, Maharashtra. This college offers different courses in arts and commerce. It is affiliated to Rashtrasant Tukadoji Maharaj Nagpur University.

Departments

Marathi
English
Hindi
History
Political Science
Economics
Sanskrit
Sociology
Geography
Philosophy
Physical Education
Computer Science
Management
Commerce

Accreditation
The college is  recognized by the University Grants Commission (UGC).

References

External links

Colleges affiliated to Rashtrasant Tukadoji Maharaj Nagpur University
Educational institutions established in 1930
1930 establishments in India
Universities and colleges in Maharashtra
Universities and colleges in Nagpur